René Sterckx (born 18 January 1991) is a Belgian professional football player with Spanish roots.

Career
On 19 June 2010, he signed a three-year contract with Anderlecht, but was immediately loaned out for two consecutive seasons to Zulte Waregem. He joined Waasland-Beveren on a loan deal in January 2013 and six months later, agreed on a three-year deal to make his stay permanent.

On 15 July 2019, Sterckx joined SK Londerzeel. He left the club at the end of the season.

Notes

External links
 
 

1991 births
Living people
Belgian footballers
R.S.C. Anderlecht players
S.V. Zulte Waregem players
S.K. Beveren players
Cercle Brugge K.S.V. players
F.C.V. Dender E.H. players
S.C. Eendracht Aalst players
Belgian Pro League players
Challenger Pro League players
Belgian people of Spanish descent
Association football midfielders